Andromeda Software Development (abbreviated ASD) is a Greek demogroup that was formed in 1992. They produced a number of small intros and demos in the mid-1990s for the PC, most notably CounterFactual (winner of the first Greek demo party ever, The Gardening 1995) and Beyond (Placed 4th in The Gardening 1996). ASD was quiet for the following years until 2001, when they presented Cadence & Cascade - their first accelerated demo - and won the Digital Nexus demoparty, held in Athens, Greece.

From 2002 onwards, ASD started participating in major demoscene competitions, eventually winning the Assembly 2005 demo competition with Iconoclast.

ASD is not associated with the Norwegian demo group Andromeda, however, ASD collaborated with Archmage of Andromeda for the production of their 2007 Assembly demo competition winner Lifeforce.

Style 
In the accelerated era, ASD established themselves as a demogroup with an extremely distinctive style. Visually, their demos featured dynamic coherent flows of abstract visual elements subtly blending into each other in various unexpected ways, often to the point where the viewer wouldn't be able to distinguish the start- and endpoints of an effect. This led to many debates considering the demos, some viewers praise this type of design, while others consider this an unnecessary amalgam of otherwise unrelated visual effects.

The two musicians of the group (aMUSiC and Leviathan, from Dreamchild) venture into the territory of progressive metal, akin to commercial bands such as Dream Theater or Liquid Tension Experiment. Their songs often feature live instruments, variating tempo and time signatures, constantly changing musical textures and a showcase of remarkable proficiency by the two composers.

Members

Active members 
 Navis (Kostas Pataridis) - code
 Amoivikos (Nikos Batalas) - 2D graphics
 iM (Stathis Sideris) - 2D graphics
 Ch3 (George Cherouvim) - 3D graphics
 aMUSiC (Sotiris Varotsis) - music
 Leviathan (Fotis Panetsos) - music

Former / Inactive / Guest members 
 Incus - Code
 Nina - Code and PR
 Odette - Modelling
 Matilda - Vocals
 Liska - Vocals and Modelling
 Roscoe - Vocals
 Ars Nova - 2D Graphics
 Pindaros - Music

Releases

MS-DOS era 
 Demo5 - (1992)
 Cosmos BBS demos series 1-7 - A series of demos released between 1993–1995
 Vertex megademo - (1993)
 Digital dreams - (1993)
 Counter Factual - Finished 1st at The Gardening 1995
 Beyond - Finished 4th at The Gardening 1996

Windows era 
 Cadence and Cascade - Finished 1st at Digital Nexus 2001
 Edge of Forever - Finished 1st at ReAct 2002
 Blue Wire - Finished 2nd at ReAct 2002
 Dreamchild - Finished 4th at Assembly 2003
 EON - Finished 2nd at ReAct 2004
 Planet Risk - Finished 2nd at Assembly 2004
 PixelShow Invitation - (2005)
 Ambience for the masses - Finished 5th at The Gathering 2005
 Aphorism for the masses - Finished 13th at Breakpoint 2005
 Antidote for the masses - Finished 1st at PixelShow 2005
 Iconoclast - Finished 1st at Assembly 2005
 PixelShow 2 Invitation - (2006)
 Animal Attraction - Finished 1st at The Gathering 2006
 Captive : the game - Finished 2nd at The Gathering 2006 gamedev compo
 Captive - Finished 3rd at Breakpoint 2006
 The Evolution of Vision - Finished 1st at Sundown 2006
 Lithography - Finished 2nd at the Intel demo trailer compo 2006
 Beyond the walls of Eryx - Finished 3rd at the second Intel demo competition 2007
 LifeForce - Finished 1st at Assembly 2007
 Zine #13 Headlines - (2008)
 Metamorphosis - Finished 2nd at Breakpoint 2008
 Realtime Generation (made with Fairlight and Alcatraz) - Finished 3rd at Outline 2008
 Size Antimatters - Finished 1st at Euskal encounter 2008
 Midnight Run - Finished 3rd at NVScene 2008
 Rupture - Finished 1st at The Gathering 2009
 Chameleon - Finished 1st at Evoke 2009
 The wind under my wings - Finished 1st at Euskal encounter 2010
 Happiness is around the bend - Finished 1st at Assembly 2010
 Anoxia Redux - Finished 7th at Main demo party 2010
 Electric Bullet - Finished 1st at TRSAC 2010
 The Butterfly Effect - Finished 1st at Euskal encounter 2011
 Spin - Finished 1st at Assembly 2011
 Monolith - Finished 1st at Assembly 2015
 For Your Love - Finished 2nd at Assembly Summer 2018

Awards 
 Scene.org Awards 2003 - Best Soundtrack nomination (Dreamchild)
 Scene.org Awards 2003 - Public's Choice nomination (Dreamchild)
 Scene.org Awards 2004 - Best Demo award (Planet Risk)
 Scene.org Awards 2004 - Best Soundtrack nomination (Planet Risk)
 Scene.org Awards 2004 - Best Effects nomination (Planet Risk)
 Scene.org Awards 2004 - Public's Choice award (Planet Risk)
 Scene.org Awards 2005 - Best Demo nomination (Iconoclast)
 Scene.org Awards 2005 - Best Effects nomination (Iconoclast)
 Scene.org Awards 2005 - Best Soundtrack nomination (Iconoclast)
 Scene.org Awards 2005 - Best Direction nomination (Iconoclast)
 Scene.org Awards 2005 - Public's Choice award (Iconoclast)
 Scene.org Awards 2006 - Best Soundtrack nomination (Animal Attraction)
 Scene.org Awards 2006 - Best Effects award (The Evolution of Vision)
 Scene.org Awards 2006 - Most Original Concept nomination (The Evolution of Vision)
 Scene.org Awards 2006 - Most Original Concept nomination (Captive)
 Scene.org Awards 2006 - Public's Choice nomination (Animal Attraction)
 Scene.org Awards 2007 - Best Demo award (Lifeforce)
 Scene.org Awards 2007 - Best Effects award (Lifeforce)
 Scene.org Awards 2007 - Public's Choice award (Lifeforce)
 Scene.org Awards 2007 - Best Direction nomination (Lifeforce)
 Scene.org Awards 2007 - Best Direction nomination (Beyond the walls of Eryx)
 Scene.org Awards 2007 - Most original concept nomination (Beyond the walls of Eryx)
 Scene.org Awards 2007 - Best graphics nomination (Lifeforce)
 Scene.org Awards 2007 - Best Soundtrack nomination (Lifeforce)
 Scene.org Awards 2008 - Best Soundtrack award (Midnight Run)
 Scene.org Awards 2008 - Best Direction nomination (Midnight Run)
 Scene.org Awards 2008 - Most Original Concept nomination (Metamorphosis)
 Scene.org Awards 2008 - Best Demo nomination (Metamorphosis)
 Scene.org Awards 2008 - Best Effects nomination (Size Antimatters)
 Scene.org Awards 2008 - Best Graphics nomination (Size Antimatters)
 Scene.org Awards 2008 - Best Effects nomination (Realtime Generation)
 Scene.org Awards 2009 - Public's Choice award (Rupture)
 Scene.org Awards 2009 - Best Demo award (Rupture)
 Scene.org Awards 2009 - Best Direction award (Rupture)
 Scene.org Awards 2009 - Best Direction nomination (Chameleon)
 Scene.org Awards 2009 - Best Effects nomination (Rupture)
 Scene.org Awards 2009 - Best Graphics nomination (Rupture)
 Scene.org Awards 2009 - Best Soundtrack nomination (Rupture)
 Scene.org Awards 2009 - Best Soundtrack nomination (Chameleon)
 Scene.org Awards 2010 - Best Demo nomination (Happiness is Around the Bend)
 Scene.org Awards 2010 - Best Effects nomination (Happiness is Around the Bend)
 Scene.org Awards 2010 - Best Graphics nomination (Happiness is Around the Bend)
 Scene.org Awards 2010 - Best Direction nomination (Happiness is Around the Bend)
 Scene.org Awards 2010 - Public's Choice nomination (Happiness is Around the Bend)
 FMX 2006 - Best Realtime Demo nomination (Iconoclast)
 Bitfilm Festival 2008 - Winner in realtime category (Lifeforce)
 Animatu 2009 - Winner in Demoscene competition
 Assembly 2003 - 4th place (Dreamchild)
 Assembly 2004 - 2nd place (Planet Risk)
 Assembly 2005 - Winner (Iconoclast)
 Assembly 2007 - Winner (Lifeforce )
 Assembly 2010 - Winner (Happiness is Around the Bend)
 Assembly 2011 - Winner (Spin)
 Assembly 2015 - Winner (Monolith)

External links
 ASD home page
 ASD page at Pouet.net

1992 establishments in Greece
Demogroups